is a Japanese television jidaigeki or period drama that was broadcast in 1975–1976. The lead star is Shintaro Katsu, his older brother Tomisaburo Wakayama also appeared in the episode5,7,25.

Plot
Kōchiyama Sōshun is a serves as a cha-bōzu　(He is kind of tea man) in the administrative headquarters of the Tokugawa shogunate but he works behind the scene to protect powerless people from  evil power of Tokugawa shogunate. Kaneko Ichinojō and Ushimatsu work for Kōchiyama.

Cast

Shintaro Katsu as Kōchiyama Sōshun
Yoshio Harada as Kaneko Ichinojō
Shōhei Hino as Ushimatsu
Hide Demon as Kataoka Naojirō
Kaori Momoi as Ochiyo
Mitsuko Kusabue as Otaki
Tomisaburo Wakayama as Tōyama Kinsirō
So Yamamura as Mizuno Tadakuni
Hideji Ōtaki as Moritaya Seibei
Naruse Tadashi
Hosei Komatsu as Nishiyama Gensai
Shin Kishida as Tori Yozō

Directors
Shintaro Katsu (Episode15,23,25)
Kenji Misumi (Episode1,5,7)
Eiichi Kudo (Episode2,10,20)
Kimiyoshi Yasuda (Episode16,24)
Kazuo Mori (Episode4,11)

See also
Oshizamurai Kiichihōgan, (1973)TV series Tomisaburo Wakayama and Shintaro Katsu appeared.

References

1975 Japanese television series debuts
1970s drama television series
Jidaigeki television series